Thomas M. Dame is Director of the Radio Telescope Data Center at the Center for Astrophysics  Harvard & Smithsonian, a Senior Radio Astronomer at the Smithsonian Astrophysical Observatory, and a Lecturer on Astronomy at Harvard University. He is best known for mapping the Milky Way galaxy in Carbon Monoxide and for the discovery of both the Far 3 kpc Arm and the Outer Scutum–Centaurus Arm of the Milky Way.

Education
Dame graduated from Boston University in 1976 with a BA in Astronomy and Physics. He earned his Master's degrees and Ph.D. from Columbia University. His dissertation, earned under Patrick Thaddeus in 1983, was titled Molecular Clouds and Galactic Spiral Structure .

Career

After earning his doctorate, Dame worked as the National Research Council resident research associate at the Goddard Institute for Space Studies from 1983 to 1984 and then as a research associate at the Columbia University Department of Astronomy. He moved to Harvard University with Thaddeus in 1986, becoming a teaching fellow in 1988. Dame is Director of the Radio Telescope Data Center at the Center for Astrophysics  Harvard & Smithsonian.

Dame and Thaddeus have obtained what is by far the most extensive, uniform, and widely used Galactic survey of interstellar carbon monoxide (CO).

Dame discovered the Far 3 kpc Arm of the Milky Way in 2008 and the Outer Sct-Cen Arm in 2011.

Publications

Dame has authored or co-authored more than 100 research papers in astronomy.

Honors and awards

Secretary's Research Prize, Smithsonian Institution, 2009
Special Achievement Awards, Smithsonian Institution, 1989, 1997, 1999, 2007, 2009, 2010
Postdoctoral Associateship, National Academy of Sciences (N.R.C.), 1983–1984
Columbia University Graduate Fellowship, 1976–1978
College Prize for Excellence in Astronomy, Boston University, 1976

Professional memberships
American Astronomical Society

References

External links
Thomas M. Dame at the Center for Astrophysics  Harvard & Smithsonian
Thomas M. Dame, Faculty Webpage, Harvard University Department of Astronomy
Thomas M. Dame CV at Center for Astrophysics | Harvard & Smithsonian
Mapping the Milky Way lecture for "Science for the Public" series at Harvard

American astronomers
Columbia University alumni
Harvard University faculty
Living people
Boston University alumni
Year of birth missing (living people)